Karl Yulievich Davydov was a Russian cellist, described by Pyotr Ilyich Tchaikovsky as the "czar of cellists". He was also a composer, mainly for the cello. His name also appears in various different spellings: Davydov, Davidoff,  Davidov, and more, with his first name sometimes written as Charles or Carl.

Biography
Davydov was the son of a Jewish physician and amateur violinist, Yuly Petrovich Davidhoff from Courland Governorate. His elder brother August Davidov was a noted mathematician and educator, and his nephew Alexei Davidov also became cellist and composer and also a businessman.

In his youth Davydov studied mathematics at St. Petersburg University, and then pursued a career as a composer, studying with Moritz Hauptmann at the Leipzig Conservatory. He became a full-time cello soloist in 1850 while continuing to compose. He took a post as a professor of cello at the St Petersburg Conservatory in 1863, and subsequently became director in 1878. In 1886 scandal forced him from his position, and Anton Rubinstein took the helm. He had many students, including Aleksandr Verzhbilovich.

He intended to write an opera on the subject of Mazeppa. Viktor Burenin wrote a libretto for this purpose in 1880, but when Davydov proved unable to find the time to compose, Burenin offered the libretto to Tchaikovsky.  Although closely associated with Tchaikovsky, Karl Davydov was not related to the Princes Davydov, Russian Orthodox, into which Tchaikovsky's sister Alexandra married.

Davydov was well-connected with a great number of the top-tier composers, musicians and nobility. In 1870 Count Wilhorsky, a patron of the arts, presented Davydov with a Stradivarius cello constructed in 1712. This cello, now known as the Davidov Stradivarius, was owned by Jacqueline du Pré until her death and is currently on loan to cellist Yo-Yo Ma. Several composers dedicated works to him, notably Tchaikovsy's Cappricio Italien and Anton Arensky's first piano trio.

Davydov went on to write his still-popular "cello school" book of etudes and technique, completed in 1888, taking the physical limitations into considerations for advancing the possibilities in both the bow hand and playing in the high registers. Davydov died in Moscow on 26 February 1889.

In 2019 a Moscow regional cello competition was established in his name.

Cello transcriptions
Davydov transcribed and arranged Chopin's solo piano works for violoncello and piano accompaniment. Transcription albums of Walzer and Mazurkas published by Breitkopf & Härtel. Another transcription album is a selection of Nocturnes and others solo piano works published by Edition Peters.

Selected works
 Opus 5, Cello Concerto No. 1 in B minor (1859)
 Opus 6, Souvenir de Zarizino: 2 salon pieces (Nocturne – Mazurka) for cello and piano
 Opus 7, Fantasie from a Russian folk song for cello and orchestra
 Opus 9, 3 Pièces caractéristiques for cello and piano
 Opus 11, Concert Allegro in A minor for cello and orchestra or cello and piano
 Opus 14, Cello Concerto No. 2 in A minor (1863)(1860?)
 Opus 16, 3 Salon pieces (Mondnacht, Lied, Märchen) for cello and piano
 Opus 17, Souvenirs d'Oranienbaum (Adian – Barcarolle)
 Opus 18, Cello Concerto No. 3 in D major (1868)
 Opus 20, 4 Pieces for Cello and Piano
No. 1, Sonntag Morgen (Sunday Morning)
No. 2, Am Springbrunnen (At the Fountain)
No. 3, An der Wiege
No. 4, Abenddämmerung
 Opus 23, Romance sans Paroles in G major
 Opus 25, Ballade for cello and orchestra or piano in G major (1875)
 Opus 30, 3 salon pieces
 Opus 31, Cello Concerto No. 4 in E minor (1878)
 Opus 35, String Sextet
 Opus 37, Suite pour l'orchestre (Suite for Orchestra)
I. Scéne rustique
II. Quasi valse
III. Scherzo
IV. Petite romance
V. Marche
 "Poltawa", Opera after Pushkin (1876, unfinished)
Hymn for 10 Celli and Percussion
 Opus 40, Quintet for Piano and Strings in G minor (1884)

References

 Wasielewski, Wilhelm Joseph von; Stigand, Isobella S. E. (1894). The violoncello and its history. University of Michigan. London, Novello and Company, Limited; New York, Novello, Ewer and co: Complete text at archive.org
 
  (family name written incorrectly)

External links
 
Worldcat Identity
Correspondence with Tchaikovsky
Profile of Davydov at Naxos Music Library

1838 births
1889 deaths
19th-century classical composers
19th-century male musicians
People from Courland Governorate
People from Kuldīga
Russian classical cellists
Russian male classical composers
Russian Romantic composers
Academic staff of the University of Music and Theatre Leipzig
20th-century cellists